"Schwertlied" ("Sword Song") is a poem by Theodor Körner, written shortly before his death in battle on 26 August 1813.

Historic context 
Theodor Körner was a famous poet during his lifetime, and was appointed poet to the court at the Vienna Burgtheater. He nonetheless gave up his civilian life and joined the Lützow Free Corps, a Prussian military unit composed of volunteers from all over Germany.

As a soldier, Körner wrote several patriotic poems, like "Lützows wilde, verwegene Jagd" and the "Schwertlied". Several hours after having written the "Schwertlied" Körner fell in battle near Gadebusch (Mecklenburg), and consequently became a national hero in Germany.

Content 

"Schwertlied" functions as paean of warrior spirit. Therein, Körner describes the relationship between a soldier and his sword as if the weapon were his bride thirsting for blood. In the end, he draws the sword, as battle awaits him, thus making the marriage legal before God ("At last / Hath truly God allied / The right hand to the bride.").

Settings 
The poem was set to music by Carl Maria von Weber in 1814 (op. 42 Nr. 6, J. 169).

Franz Schubert set the poem as a part-song (or cantata) for voice, unison choir and piano, on 12 March 1815 ( 170). It was first published in 1873, and in the 1894 edition of Series XX, Volume 2 of Franz Schubert's Works it was published as No. 54.

See also 
Theodor Körner (opera)
Lützows wilde, verwegene Jagd

References 

German patriotic songs
German poems
Part songs by Franz Schubert